Brachymetatarsia is a condition in which there is one or more abnormally short or overlapping toe bones (metatarsals). This condition may result due to a congenital defect or it may be an acquired condition.  It most frequently involves the fourth metatarsal.  If it involves the first metatarsal, the condition is known as Morton's syndrome.  Treatment is via a number of differing surgical procedures.

Diagnosis

Differential diagnosis
Congenital causes include: Aarskog syndrome, Turner syndrome, Albright's hereditary osteodystrophy, maternal ingestion of thalidomide during pregnancy and Apert syndrome. Can be caused by a trauma, although the exact mechanism is not known.

Treatment

Symptoms may be treated by wearing wider shoes to relieve pressure, or patient can wear padding around the toes.  Surgery is also an option, if the pain and discomfort cannot be treated, or for cosmetic reasons.   In this procedure, the short metatarsal is typically cut and a piece of bone is grafted between the two ends. In some cases an external fixator may be attached to the metatarsal with pins.  Within the external fixator is an adjustable screw that must be turned (per doctors' orders) to lengthen the gap between bone segments, so the bone will regrow to the appropriate shape.

Following surgery, crutches or a knee scooter should be used to keep all weight off the surgically repaired foot for 3 months.  After this period, orthopedic shoes or boots may be used.

Epidemiology
Brachymetatarsia is found to occur more frequently in women than men. Brachymetatarsia affecting the first metatarsal of the foot is the most common type of brachymetatarsia, with approximately 22% of the population being affected by it.

References

Foot diseases
Skeletal disorders